is a district located in Okayama Prefecture, Japan.

As of 2003, the district has an estimated population of 21,285 and a population density of 130.33 persons per km2. The total area is 163.32 km2.

Towns and villages
Yakage

Merger
On March 1, 2005, the town of Bisei merged into the city of Ibara.

Districts in Okayama Prefecture